Claudia Salvarani (born 8 March 1975) is a former Italian female middle-distance runner.

Biography
She won six national championships at senior level, 5 outdoor, and one indoor. Her personal best 2:01.23, set in Paris 1999, is the 11th best Italian performance of all-time. In 1999 her crono was also the 60th world best performance of the year in the IAAF season's lists.

National titles
 Italian Athletics Championships
 800 metres: 1997, 1998, 2000, 2002, 2003
 Italian Athletics Indoor Championships
 800 metres: 1997

References

External links
 

1975 births
Living people
Italian female middle-distance runners
Athletics competitors of Fiamme Oro